Gemma Ubasart González is a Spanish political scientist and politician. She has served as a city councilor in Castellar del Vallès, secretary for international affairs and public policies for change in Podemos, and secretary general of Podemos in Catalonia.

Career
Ubasart attended the Autonomous University of Barcelona, where she graduated with a PhD. She also obtained a graduate degree in the penal system and human rights at the University of Barcelona, as well as a postgraduate degree in applied social research and data analysis. She became a professor at the University of Girona, and has also been a professor at the Autonomous University of Madrid.

In the 2007 Spanish local elections, she was elected to the city council of her municipality, affiliated with the L'Altraveu per Castellar (es). In November 2014 she was elected a member of the Citizen Council of Podemos, and joined the Coordination Council of Pablo Iglesias Turrión as secretary of international affairs and public policies for change. In February 2015, she was elected secretary general of Podemos in Catalonia, and she held that position until October 10, 2015.

References

Living people
Women political scientists
Spanish political scientists
Government advisors
Year of birth missing (living people)